General Sir James Malcolm Glover,  (25 March 1929 – 4 June 2000) was a senior British Army officer who served as Commander-in-Chief, Land Forces from 1985 to 1987.

Army career
Educated at Wellington College, Jimmy Glover, as he was generally known, was commissioned into the Royal Artillery in 1949. He transferred to the Rifle Brigade in 1956 and served with the brigade during the Malayan Emergency. He was commanding officer of the 3rd Battalion Royal Green Jackets from 1970 to 1971. He then went on to command 19 Air Portable Brigade from 1974 to 1975. He was Commander of Land Forces in Northern Ireland from 1979 to 1980. He was then Deputy Chief of Defence Staff (Intelligence) from 1981 to 1983 and Vice Chief of the General Staff from 1983 to 1985. He served as the Commander-in-Chief, Land Forces from 1985 to 1987 when he retired.

Later career
In retirement he was a Director of BP and Chairman of Royal Armouries International plc. He died in 2000, aged 71.

In 1988 in a BBC documentary by journalist Peter Taylor, Glover was asked by Taylor if the Provisional IRA could be militarily defeated to which Glover replied "In no way, can or will the Provisional Irish Republican Army ever be defeated militarily."

Further reading
 Walker, Derek and Wilson, Guy, The Royal Armouries in Leeds – The Making of a Museum, Royal Armouries, 1996

References

|-

|-
 

1929 births
2000 deaths
British Army generals
British Army personnel of the Malayan Emergency
British military personnel of The Troubles (Northern Ireland)
Knights Commander of the Order of the Bath
Members of the Order of the British Empire
People educated at Wellington College, Berkshire
Rifle Brigade officers
Royal Artillery officers
Royal Green Jackets officers